Some Kind of Salvation is the second full-length album from Tennessee-based band The Features. It was digitally self-released on June 23, 2008, with no advance notice or publicity, and followed with a vinyl self-release on September 30, 2008.

The album was produced by Grammy Award-winning Jacquire King (Modest Mouse, Kings Of Leon, Tom Waits, Sea Wolf) and Brian Carter at his Paradox Production facility in Murfreesboro, TN.

In June 2009, the band was signed to 429 Records, an imprint of Bug Music and curated by fellow Tennessee band Kings of Leon. The album was the first official release by the new label on July 28, 2009.

The songs "The Temporary Blues" and "The Gates of Hell" premiered during a lounge performance for WOXY.com, on June, 2007.

Track listing
"Whatever Gets You By" – 1:16
"The Drawing Board" – 2:28
"Foundation's Cracked" – 3:01
"GMF (Genetically Modified Fable)" – 3:09
"The Temporary Blues" – 4:05
"Wooden Heart" – 3:13
"The Gates of Hell" – 4:30
"Still Lost" – 1:58
"Baby's Hammer" – 2:56
"Lions" – 3:36
"Concrete" – 2:25
"Off Track" – 2:59
"All I Ask" – 4:35
"Now You Know" (vinyl only) – 2:36
"Mosis Tosis" (vinyl only) – 2:38

References

2008 albums
The Features albums
Albums produced by Jacquire King